Trece Costa Rica Televisión is a public Costa Rican television channel, owned and operated by Sistema Nacional de Radio y Television S.A. (SINART).

External links 
Official website

Television stations in Costa Rica
Spanish-language television stations
Television channels and stations established in 1978